Saros cycle series 154 for solar eclipses occurs at the Moon's descending node, repeating every 18 years, 11 days, containing 71 events, with 61 before 3000 AD. All eclipses in this series occurs at the Moon's descending node.

Umbral eclipses
Umbral eclipses (annular, total and hybrid) can be further classified as either: 1) Central (two limits), 2) Central (one limit) or 3) Non-Central (one limit). The statistical distribution of these classes in Saros series 154 appears in the following table.

Events

References 
 http://eclipse.gsfc.nasa.gov/SEsaros/SEsaros154.html

External links
Saros cycle 154 - Information and visualization

Solar saros series